Daniel Gousseau (died August 3, 1969), a French army private and later secretary-general of the French Cycling Union, is credited as having invented the sport of cyclo-cross.

Gousseau organized the first French National Cyclo-Cross Championships in sport.

References
Konrad, Gabe (1996). "Cyclocross: History & What You Should Know". Bicycle Trader Magazine. Retrieved March 4, 2006.

French male cyclists
1969 deaths
Cycle racing executives
Year of birth missing
Place of birth missing